The Cauchy momentum equation is a vector partial differential equation put forth by Cauchy that describes the non-relativistic momentum transport in any continuum.

Main equation
In convective (or Lagrangian) form the Cauchy momentum equation is written as:

where 
  is the flow velocity vector field, which depends on time and space,
  is time,
  is the density at a given point of the continuum (for which the continuity equation holds),
  is the stress tensor, 
  is a vector containing all of the accelerations caused by body forces (sometimes simply gravitational acceleration), 
  is the divergence of stress tensor.

Commonly used SI units are given in parentheses although the equations are general in nature and other units can be entered into them or units can be removed at all by nondimensionalization.

Note that only we use column vectors (in the Cartesian coordinate system) above for clarity, but the equation is written using physical components (which are neither covariants ("column") nor contravariants ("row") ). However, if we chose a non-orthogonal curvilinear coordinate system, then we should calculate and write equations in covariant ("row vectors") or contravariant ("column vectors") form.

After an appropriate change of variables, it can also be written in conservation form:

where  is the momentum density at a given space-time point,  is the flux associated to the momentum density, and  contains all of the body forces per unit volume.

Differential derivation
Let us start with the generalized momentum conservation principle which can be written as follows: "The change in system momentum is proportional to the resulting force acting on this system". It is expressed by the formula:

Let us analyse each side of the equation above.

Right side

We split the forces into body forces  and surface forces 

Surface forces act on walls of the cubic fluid element. For each wall, the X component of these forces was marked in the figure with a cubic element (in the form of a product of stress and surface area e.g.  with units ).

Adding forces (their X components) acting on each of the cube walls, we get:

After ordering  and performing similar reasoning for components  (they have not been shown in the figure, but these would be vectors parallel to the Y and Z axes, respectively) we get:

We can then write it in the symbolic operational form:

There are mass forces acting on the inside of the control volume. We can write them using the acceleration field  (e.g. gravitational acceleration):

Left side

Let us calculate momentum of the cube:

Because we assume that tested mass (cube)  is constant in time, so

Left and Right side comparison
We have

then

then

which finishes the derivation.

Integral derivation
Applying Newton's second law (th component) to a control volume in the continuum being modeled gives:

Then, based on the Reynolds transport theorem and using material derivative notation, one can write

where  represents the control volume. Since this equation must hold for any control volume, it must be true that the integrand is zero, from this the Cauchy momentum equation follows. The main step (not done above) in deriving this equation is establishing that the derivative of the stress tensor is one of the forces that constitutes .

Conservation form

The Cauchy momentum equation can also be put in the following form:

simply by defining:

where  is the momentum density at the point considered in the continuum (for which the continuity equation holds),  is the flux associated to the momentum density, and  contains all of the body forces per unit volume.  is the dyad of the velocity.

Here  and  have same number of dimensions  as the flow speed and the body acceleration, while , being a tensor, has .

In the Eulerian forms it is apparent that the assumption of no deviatoric stress brings Cauchy equations to the Euler equations.

Convective acceleration

A significant feature of the Navier–Stokes equations is the presence of convective acceleration: the effect of time-independent acceleration of a flow with respect to space. While individual continuum particles indeed experience time dependent acceleration, the convective acceleration of the flow field is a spatial effect, one example being fluid speeding up in a nozzle.

Regardless of what kind of continuum is being dealt with, convective acceleration is a nonlinear effect. Convective acceleration is present in most flows (exceptions include one-dimensional incompressible flow), but its dynamic effect is disregarded in creeping flow (also called Stokes flow). Both interpretations give the same result.

Advection operator vs tensor derivative 

This representation can be contrasted to the one in terms of the tensor derivative.

Lamb form
The vector calculus identity of the cross product of a curl holds:

where the Feynman subscript notation  is used, which means the subscripted gradient operates only on the factor .

Lamb in his famous classical book Hydrodynamics (1895), used this identity to change the convective term of the flow velocity in rotational form, i.e. without a tensor derivative:

where the vector  is called the Lamb vector. The Cauchy momentum equation becomes:

Using the identity:

the Cauchy equation becomes:

In fact, in case of an external conservative field, by defining its potential :

In case of a steady flow the time derivative of the flow velocity disappears, so the momentum equation becomes:

And by projecting the momentum equation on the flow direction, i.e. along a streamline, the cross product disappears due to a vector calculus identity of the triple scalar product:

If the stress tensor is isotropic, then only the pressure enters:  (where  is the identity tensor), and the Euler momentum equation in the steady incompressible case becomes:

In the steady incompressible case the mass equation is simply:

that is, the mass conservation for a steady incompressible flow states that the density along a streamline is constant. This leads to a considerable simplification of the Euler momentum equation:

The convenience of defining the total head for an inviscid liquid flow is now apparent:

in fact, the above equation can be simply written as:

That is, the momentum balance for a steady inviscid and incompressible flow in an external conservative field states that the total head along a streamline is constant.

Irrotational flows
The Lamb form is also useful in irrotational flow, where the curl of the velocity (called vorticity)  is equal to zero. In that case, the convection term in  reduces to

Stresses
Here  is the pressure gradient and arises from the isotropic part of the Cauchy stress tensor. This part is given by the normal stresses that occur in almost all situations. Thus,  is the deviatoric stress tensor, and the stress tensor is equal to:

where  is the identity matrix in the space considered and  the shear tensor.

All non-relativistic momentum conservation equations, such as the Navier–Stokes equation, can be derived by beginning with the Cauchy momentum equation and specifying the stress tensor through a constitutive relation. By expressing the shear tensor in terms of viscosity and fluid velocity, and assuming constant density and viscosity, the Cauchy momentum equation will lead to the Navier–Stokes equations. By assuming inviscid flow, the Navier–Stokes equations can further simplify to the Euler equations.

The divergence of the stress tensor can be written as

The effect of the pressure gradient on the flow is to accelerate the flow in the direction from high pressure to low pressure.

Besides the equations of motion—Newton's second law—a force model is needed relating the stresses to the flow motion. For this reason, assumptions based on natural observations are often applied to specify the stresses in terms of the other flow variables, such as velocity and density.

External forces
The vector field  represents body forces per unit mass. Typically, these consist of only gravity acceleration, but may include others, such as electromagnetic forces. In non-inertial coordinate frames, other "inertial accelerations" associated with rotating coordinates may arise.

Because pressure from such gravitation arises only as a gradient, we may include it in the pressure term as a body force . The pressure and force terms on the right-hand side of the Navier–Stokes equation become

It is also possible to include external influences into the stress term  rather than the body force term. This may even include antisymmetric stresses (inputs of angular momentum), in contrast to the usually symmetrical internal contributions to the stress tensor.

Nondimensionalisation
In order to make the equations dimensionless, a characteristic length  and a characteristic velocity  need to be defined. These should be chosen such that the dimensionless variables are all of order one. The following dimensionless variables are thus obtained:

Substitution of these inverted relations in the Euler momentum equations yields:

and by dividing for the first coefficient:

Now defining the Froude number:

the Euler number:

and the coefficient of skin-friction or the one usually referred as 'drag' co-efficient in the field of aerodynamics:

by passing respectively to the conservative variables, i.e. the momentum density and the force density:

the equations are finally expressed (now omitting the indexes):

Cauchy equations in the Froude limit  (corresponding to negligible external field) are named free Cauchy equations:

and can be eventually conservation equations. The limit of high Froude numbers (low external field) is thus notable for such equations and is studied with perturbation theory.

Finally in convective form the equations are:

3D explicit convective forms

Cartesian 3D coordinates
For asymmetric stress tensors, equations in general take the following forms:

Cylindrical 3D coordinates 

Below, we write the main equation in pressure-tau form assuming that the stress tensor is symmetrical:

See also 
Euler equations (fluid dynamics)
Navier–Stokes equations
Burnett equations
Chapman–Enskog expansion

Notes

References

Continuum mechanics
Equations of physics
Momentum
Partial differential equations